Absolut Citron is one of the major core flavors of Absolut Vodka. The name means "lemon" in Swedish, and it is made from citrus fruits. It is crafted from Swedish winter wheat and water comes from deep well in Åhus.  Absolut Citron was launched in 1988.
The drink is best suited for cocktail cosmopolitans and among many other drinks.

List of Absolut cocktails with Absolut Citron

References

External links
"Lemon Flavored Vodka - Absolut Citron". www.absolut.com (official website).

Goods manufactured in Sweden
Swedish vodkas